Basil Eric Goldstone (October 1909 – 1 December 1988) was a British Liberal Party activist.

Goldstone studied at Richmond Hill School and Dover College before joining the Royal Air Force. He stood repeatedly for the Liberal Party in general elections, but was never elected: in Hendon in 1935, Petersfield in 1945, Dover in 1950 and 1959, Basingstoke in 1964, Peterborough in 1966, Norfolk South in 1970, and Harlow in February and October 1974. He served for some years on Kingsclere and Whitchurch Rural District Council.

Later in life, Goldstone worked as a hospital catering officer. In 1976–77, he served as the president of the Liberal Party.  A long-term supporter of animal rights, in 1978, he proposed wide-ranging animal protection legislation, which the party voted to support.

References

1909 births
1988 deaths
People educated at Dover College
Presidents of the Liberal Party (UK)
Councillors in Hampshire
Liberal Democrats (UK) councillors